Giovanni Errichiello (born 12 June 1960) is an Italian former volleyball player who competed in the 1984 Summer Olympics.

He was born in Naples.

In 1984 he was part of the Italian team which won the bronze medal in the Olympic tournament. He played all six matches.

External links

Footnotes 

1960 births
Living people
Italian men's volleyball players
Olympic volleyball players of Italy
Volleyball players at the 1984 Summer Olympics
Olympic bronze medalists for Italy
Sportspeople from Naples
Olympic medalists in volleyball
Medalists at the 1984 Summer Olympics
20th-century Italian people